Aloma  is a feminine given name (and occasionally a surname) meaning "dove." Aloma is an extremely uncommon name, ranking the 25216th most popular feminine given name.

Notable people

Notable people with the name include:

As a given name
Aloma Mariam Mukhtar (born 1944), Nigerian jurist and former Chief Justice of Nigeria
Aloma Wright (born 1950), American actress

As a surname
Hal Aloma (1908–1980), Hawaiian musician

References

Feminine given names